Curiti is a town and municipality in the Santander Department in North-Eastern Colombia. The area is famous for crafts made from fique, or agave sisal.

Curiti is the birthplace of Alejandro Galvis Galvis, a renowned politician and publisher.

References

Municipalities of Santander Department